Ralph Rugoff  (born 12 January 1957) is an American-born curator, the director of London's Hayward Gallery since 2006, and the curator of the Venice Biennale in 2019.

Rugoff was born in New York City to a psychoanalyst, Evangeline Peterson, and Donald Rugoff, the film distributor and movie theater owner profiled in a 2019 film Searching for Mr. Rugoff. He studied semiotics at Brown University.

Rugoff was director of the Wattis Institute for Contemporary Arts in San Francisco for nearly six years, before becoming the director of London's Hayward Gallery.

Rugoff was artistic director of the 58th Venice Biennale in 2019.

He was appointed Officer of the Order of the British Empire (OBE) in the 2019 Birthday Honours for services to art.

References

Further reading 

 

Living people
American art curators
1957 births
Brown University alumni
People from New York City
Officers of the Order of the British Empire
American emigrants to England
British art curators
Naturalised citizens of the United Kingdom
Venice Biennale artistic directors